The BMT Broadway Line is a rapid transit line of the B Division of the New York City Subway in Manhattan. The line is often referred to as the "N and R", since those were the only services on the line from 1988 to 2001, when the Manhattan Bridge's southern tracks were closed for rebuilding. The Broadway Line was built to give the Brooklyn Rapid Transit Company (later the Brooklyn–Manhattan Transit Corporation, or BMT) access to Midtown Manhattan.

The line is named for its location under Broadway between Vesey Street and Seventh Avenue/45th Street (Times Square). It also passes under Vesey Street, Whitehall Street, Trinity Place, and Church Street in Lower Manhattan, and Seventh Avenue, 59th Street, and 60th Street in Midtown. The local tracks stretch the entire length between the two East River tunnels: the Montague Street Tunnel to the BMT Fourth Avenue Line in Brooklyn and the 60th Street Tunnel to the BMT Astoria Line and 60th Street Tunnel Connection in Queens. Center express tracks exist between Canal Street and 57th Street, turning off at Canal Street to feed the south tracks on the Manhattan Bridge, and continuing north and east under Central Park as the IND/BMT 63rd Street Line (connecting with the Second Avenue Subway). The Broadway Line was the only Manhattan outlet north of Delancey Street for the BMT's Brooklyn lines until 1967, when a little over half the BMT Brighton Line and all BMT West End Line trains were moved to the IND Sixth Avenue Line via the new Chrystie Street Connection.

Description and service 
The following services use the Broadway Line and are colored :

The BMT Broadway Line begins at the 60th Street Tunnel from Queens. The N and W trains from the BMT Astoria Line and the R service from the IND Queens Boulevard Line join at the beginning of the tunnel. The line runs west as a two-track subway line under 60th Street (east of Fifth Avenue) and 59th Street (west of Fifth Avenue), with stations at Lexington Avenue/59th Street and Fifth Avenue/59th Street. It then turns south to Seventh Avenue into the 57th Street–Seventh Avenue station.

At the 57th Street station, the line joins two express tracks that enter the station from the north via the BMT 63rd Street Line, which the Q uses (with rush hour service from the N and R). The line proceeds as a four-track subway down Seventh Avenue to its intersection with Broadway at Times Square-42nd Street, and then continues down Broadway to a point north of Canal Street, where the express tracks carrying the N and Q services descend and turn sharply east to separate platforms from the local tracks, before crossing the south side of the Manhattan Bridge to go to Brooklyn.

Immediately after Canal Street, the express tracks resume again (originally they had been intended to run through) and serve as storage and turning tracks, bypassing the Canal Street local station and ending in the disused lower level of City Hall. The local tracks continue south as a two-track subway to Whitehall Street–South Ferry station. Whitehall Street–South Ferry is a three track, two-platform station, with the center track set up as a terminal track for the W train during weekdays, and late night R trains. A pair of bellmouths exists here, allowing for a connection to a never-built East River tunnel south of the Montague Street Tunnel that would have connected to Atlantic Avenue in Brooklyn. It has been proposed to use this as part of the Lower Manhattan–Jamaica/JFK Transportation Project, connecting to the Court Street station (New York Transit Museum) in Brooklyn.

The BMT Broadway Line then curves east carrying the R train to a trailing non-revenue connection with the BMT Nassau Street Line and enters the Montague Street Tunnel to Brooklyn.

History

Planning 
The New York Public Service Commission adopted plans for what was known as the Broadway–Lexington Avenue route on December 31, 1907. This route began at the Battery and ran under Greenwich Street, Vesey Street, Broadway to Ninth Street, private property to Irving Place, and Irving Place and Lexington Avenue to the Harlem River. After crossing under the Harlem River into the Bronx, the route split at Park Avenue and 138th Street, with one branch continuing north to and along Jerome Avenue to Woodlawn Cemetery, and the other heading east and northeast along 138th Street, Southern Boulevard, and Westchester Avenue to Pelham Bay Park. In early 1908, the Tri-borough plan was formed, combining this route, the under-construction Centre Street Loop Subway in Manhattan and Fourth Avenue Subway in Brooklyn, a Canal Street subway from the Fourth Avenue Subway via the Manhattan Bridge to the Hudson River, and several other lines in Brooklyn.

The Brooklyn Rapid Transit Company submitted a proposal to the Commission, dated March 2, 1911, to operate the Tri-borough system (but under Church Street instead of Greenwich Street), as well as a branch along Broadway, Seventh Avenue, and 59th Street from Ninth Street north and east to the Queensboro Bridge; the Canal Street subway was to merge with the Broadway Line instead of continuing to the Hudson River. The city, the BRT, and the Interborough Rapid Transit Company (which operated the first subway and four elevated lines in Manhattan) came to an agreement, and sent a report to the New York City Board of Estimate on June 5, 1911. The line along Broadway to 59th Street was assigned to the BRT, while the IRT obtained the Lexington Avenue line, connecting with its existing route at Grand Central–42nd Street. Construction began on Lexington Avenue on July 31, and on Broadway the next year. The Dual Contracts, two operating contracts between the city and the BMT and IRT, were adopted on March 4, 1913. Originally, the current 49th Street station (which was actually originally planned to be at 47th Street) was going to be an express station, and 57th Street was to be a local station as reflected by original contract drawings. Then in December 1913, both 47th and 57th Streets were both going to be express stations, with no express station at Times Square–42nd Street itself, but rather a local station at 38th Street. Finally, in 1914, it was switched, with 57th Street being the express station, and 49th Street being the local station, with another express station at Times Square–42nd Street.

Construction 
Because of the complicated history, the Broadway Line includes several remnants of earlier plans. The line was built as four tracks south to City Hall, where the local tracks were to terminate on the upper level, and the express tracks were to use the lower level, curving through Vesey Street into Church Street. However, the final plan had the express tracks splitting at Canal Street and passing under the northbound local track to the Manhattan Bridge. The tracks via Canal Street and the Manhattan Bridge were not intended to be connected to the Broadway Line. Instead, they were supposed to be a crosstown line continuing further west. The tracks were connected to the Broadway Line as it allowed through operation between the Broadway Line and the Fourth Avenue Line in Brooklyn to go into operation more than a year earlier than would otherwise have been possible. From the Canal Street Bridge station, it is possible to see where the line would have continued further west to a terminal near the Hudson River. At the Canal Street local station, the express tracks terminate part of the way into the station, more evidence of the change of plans. The tunnel south of City Hall was rebuilt to bring the upper local tracks down to the lower level north of Vesey Street, and the lower level at City Hall was never used for passenger service. The lower level is currently used for train storage.

Unused construction is also present near the west end of the Queensboro Bridge. The original plan there was to build two one-track tunnels under 59th and 60th Streets, rising onto the bridge to Queens. However, on July 28, 1915, the Public Service Commission approved a change of plans requested by the New York City Board of Estimate to place both tracks under 60th Street and cross the East River in the 60th Street Tunnel, because of concern whether or not the bridge could handle the weight of all-steel subway trains. A piece of the 59th Street tunnel had already been built, concurrent with the construction of the IRT Lexington Avenue Line, and became a walkway connecting the two side platforms of the IRT's 59th Street station.

North of 57th Street provisions were built to extend the four tracks northwest through Central Park and under Eighth Avenue through the Upper West Side to Inwood, along the route later built as the IND Eighth Avenue Line. The provision existed for many years and would have allowed for a grade-separated junction, allowing Broadway service via 59th Street and Eighth Avenue to coexist. The provisions from two express tracks were connected to the BMT 63rd Street Line in 1989. The provisions from the two local tracks remain unused.

South of the Whitehall Street station provisions were built to allow for two future tunnels to Atlantic Avenue in Brooklyn.

Opening 

A short portion of the line, coming off the north side of the Manhattan Bridge through Canal Street to 14th Street–Union Square, opened on September 4, 1917, at 2 P.M., with an eight car train carrying members of the Public Service Commission, representatives of the city government and officials of the BRT, leaving Union Square toward Coney Island. Service opened to the general public at 8 P.M., with trains leaving Union Square and Coney Island simultaneously. The line was served by two services. One route ran via the Fourth Avenue Line and the Sea Beach Line to Coney Island, while the other line, the short line, ran to Ninth Avenue, where passengers could transfer for West End and Culver Line service. The initial headway on the line was three minutes during rush hours, three minutes and forty-five seconds at other times, except during late nights when service ran every fifteen minutes.

On January 5, 1918, the line was extended north to Times Square–42nd Street and south to Rector Street. Express service via the line began, with Sea Beach and West End trains that had been running local becoming expresses. The opening of this portion of the line provided additional transit service to Times Square, with a new connection to Brooklyn. Local service henceforth ran between Times Square and Rector Street. Service was extended one station to Whitehall Street–South Ferry on September 20, 1918.

The line was extended two stops northward to 57th Street on July 10, 1919. Express service between Times Square and Union Square was inaugurated on this date. Previously, express service terminated at Union Square, with local service terminating at Times Square. Express service then began to terminate at Times Square, with local service terminating at the new 57th Street station. Express service between Manhattan and Pacific Street began to run at all times except late nights. The line was extended to Lexington Avenue/59th Street on September 1, 1919.

On August 1, 1920, the Broadway Line was extended on either end, with the opening of two tunnels under the East River. On the north end the line was extended through the 60th Street Tunnel to Queensboro Plaza, and on the south end the line was extended through the Montague Street Tunnel to DeKalb Avenue with service via the BMT Brighton Line. With these extensions, the Broadway Line was completed.

Chrystie Street Connection reconfiguration 
On November 26, 1967, the Chrystie Street Connection opened, which is considered to be the most important expansion project undertaken by the New York City Transit Authority. The new connection consisted of a pair of double-track tunnels connecting the IND Sixth Avenue Line south of the Broadway–Lafayette Street station with the Williamsburg Bridge and the Manhattan Bridge north tracks. The Broadway Line had previously been connected to the north tracks of the Manhattan Bridge. As part of the project, the Broadway Line was connected to the south tracks, which had been previously used by trains from the BMT Nassau Street Line. The connection between the south tracks and the Nassau Street Line was severed, and the connection between the Broadway Line and the north tracks was also severed. Many routes, including those on the Broadway Line, changed as a result of the opening of the connection. The RR local was rerouted to Astoria, running 24/7 between Ditmars Boulevard and Bay Ridge–95th Street. To replace it in Queens, a new EE local was created, running between Forest Hills and Whitehall Street during weekdays. The Q, which was the only service via the Brighton Line, was converted to the rush-hour only QB, running express in Manhattan from 57th Street. Most of the trips were moved to the IND Sixth Avenue Line as a relocated D, but a few trips stayed as the QB. QT service was discontinued. Another rush-hours only express service, the NX, was created. It ran from 57th Street to Brighton Beach, following the N route, making express stops along the BMT Sea Beach Line, before going through Coney Island to terminate at Brighton Beach. NX service ended on April 12, 1968 due to low ridership.

At most times, the Broadway Line has had four services — two local and two express — during the day, with a third express service until the 1967 opening of the Chrystie Street Connection.
During the Manhattan Bridge reconstruction, from the 1980s until 2001, the Q mostly used the IND Sixth Avenue Line.
 2/ (BMT Fourth Avenue Line) trains (later ) have run local over the Broadway Line since 1920.
 3/ (BMT West End Line) trains ran express on the Broadway Line until 1967, when the T became part of the realigned  via the IND Sixth Avenue Line.
 4/ (BMT Sea Beach Line) trains used the express tracks until the Manhattan Bridge reconstruction in the 1980s, when all N trips became local. (Some had run local since the EE was merged into the N in 1976.)

On May 6, 1985, double letters were eliminated, and the QB was relabeled the Q, and the RR was relabeled the R.

Manhattan Bridge reconstruction: 1986–2001 
On April 26, 1986, the north side tracks on the Manhattan Bridge leading to the IND Sixth Avenue Line were closed for rehabilitation, and services that had used the north side were moved to the south side, running via the BMT Broadway Line. Because of the large amount of train traffic now running on the bridge's south side tracks, rush hour and midday N service stopped using the bridge, and began running via the Montague Street Tunnel and Lower Manhattan making local stops. However, evening, night and weekend trains continued to use the bridge and express tracks, terminating at 57th Street–Seventh Avenue. B and D services were split. Their service from the Bronx and Upper Manhattan continued to run via the Sixth Avenue Line, terminating at 34th Street. Their service to Brooklyn, however, was rerouted via the Broadway Line express tracks. D service terminated at 57th Street, while B service terminated at Ditmars Boulevard during rush hours, and at Queensboro Plaza during middays, evenings, and weekends.

Between April 26, 1986 and May 24, 1987, the N ran express via the Bridge to 57th Street during evenings, nights, and weekends. Afterwards, N service began running local via the Broadway Line during evenings, nights, and weekends, but they still operated over the Manhattan Bridge. On May 24, 1987, when the N and R swapped routes in Queens, there were additional changes in Broadway service. B service during evenings and weekends, stopped switching to the local track north of 34th Street to serve the Astoria Line. Instead, it skipped 49th Street and terminated at 57th Street.

When the north side of the Manhattan Bridge reopened on December 11, 1988, the south side of the bridge was closed. B, D, and Q trains were rerouted from the Broadway Line to the Sixth Avenue Line using the north side of the bridge. The N began running local in Manhattan and via the Montague Tunnel at all times. In order to replace B service to Ditmars Boulevard, additional N service was provided during rush hours.

On September 30, 1990, express service on the Broadway Line was restored when repair work on the Manhattan Bridge was temporarily suspended. The N then began making express stops from 34th Street to Canal Street at all times except late nights. R service between Manhattan and Brooklyn was increased during rush hours. During late nights, R trains no longer ran via the Broadway Line; instead, they operated as a shuttle in Brooklyn, terminating at 36th Street. The brief Broadway service via the Manhattan Bridge was stopped on December 27 because of a cracked beam on the bridge.

From April 30, 1995 to November 12, 1995, the Manhattan Bridge services were supposed to go back to the 1986–1988 service pattern with only the south side Broadway Line tracks in service. However, the Broadway side was not yet ready. As a result, during middays and weekends, the north side of the bridge was also closed. As a result, Q trains began serving the Broadway Line again. They ran via the Montague Street Tunnel, before switching to the express tracks after Canal Street. This service continued past 57th Street via the BMT 63rd Street Line to 21st Street–Queensbridge, being the first scheduled service to use this connection.

On February 22, 1998, construction on the IND 63rd Street Line cut B and Q service to 57th Street–Sixth Avenue. Service on the 63rd Street Line was replaced by a shuttle running from the BMT Broadway Line. Trains originally operated from 57th Street–Seventh Avenue to 21st Street–Queensbridge, with 20-minute headways. On April 6, 1998, because the service did not terminate at an ADA-accessible station, the shuttle was extended to 34th Street–Herald Square on weekdays, skipping 49th Street via the express tracks. Normal service resumed on May 22, 1999.

2001–present 
The current set of four services — N, Q, R, and W — started using the line since July 22, 2001, when the south tracks on the Manhattan Bridge reopened and the Broadway B and D services were discontinued. At this time, the north-side tracks were closed. Originally, the N was local via the Montague Street Tunnel and the BMT Sea Beach Line, and the W was express via the Manhattan Bridge and the BMT West End Line. On February 22, 2004, when the north tracks reopened, the N became express via the Manhattan Bridge and the W was short-turned at Whitehall Street, its Brooklyn section being replaced by the D.

On June 25, 2010, because of a budget shortfall, service on the Broadway Line was reduced. The W train was discontinued and was replaced by N and Q service in Manhattan and Queens, respectively. The N train, which replaced the W, began running local north of Canal Street at all times, and the Q train was extended to/from Astoria, Queens via the 60th Street Tunnel in place of the W on weekdays, stopping on the local tracks starting at Times Square–42nd Street. In December 2014, the Q began running local on the line between Canal Street and 57th Street–Seventh Avenue during late nights, to supplement late-night N service.

In early 2016, as part of the upcoming opening of the Second Avenue Subway's first phase, the MTA announced that the W service would resume operations. On November 5, 2016, late-night R service was extended to Whitehall Street in order to reduce the need to transfer and provide a direct link to Manhattan. Two days later, W trains were reintroduced, running local on weekdays between Ditmars Boulevard and Whitehall Street. The N train once again became a weekday express in Manhattan between 34th Street–Herald Square and Canal Street.  Q trains terminated at 57th Street–Seventh Avenue at all times until the first phase of the Second Avenue Subway opened on January 1, 2017, at which point the Q was extended along the Second Avenue Subway north of 57th Street.

Station listing

References

External links 

 

Brooklyn–Manhattan Transit Corporation
New York City Subway lines
Railway lines opened in 1917
Broadway (Manhattan)